"To the One of Fictive Music" is a poem from Wallace Stevens's first book of poetry, Harmonium. First published in 1922, it is in the public domain.

Interpretation
Stevens, the musical imagist, invokes the muse of poetry for "an image that is sure" in a kind of music that "gives motion to perfection more serene" than other forms of music summoned by the human condition. The poet aims at a kind of simplicity and spurns "the venom of renown." The poet's muse might be compared in these respects to Socrates' philosophical muse. Socrates condemned the sophists and Stevens' queen rejects vices analogous to theirs in poetry. The dim view of renown poetically reinforces the Adagia dictum: "Poetry is, (and should be,) for the poet, a source of pleasure and satisfaction, not a source of honors."

The use of the word 'near' is not idiosyncratic but purposeful. "Poetry is not personal," as Stevens writes in Adagia. And the clearness is not too clear. The poet's musician resists the intellect, "saving a little to endow our feignings with the strange unlike." This is an expression of the Adagia thesis that poetry must resist the intelligence almost successfully.

The poem concludes with a reminder of the musical imagist's serious purpose. The poetic musician wears a band "set with fatal stones."  None of the foregoing proposes an identification of the poem's addressee (certainly not Socrates), a necessary first step in a defensible interpretation.

Notes

References 
 Buttel, Robert. Wallace Stevens: The Making of Harmonium. Princeton University Press, 1967.  
 Kermode, Frank and Joan Richardson, Stevens: Collected Poetry and Prose. The Library of America, 1997.

1922 poems
American poems
Poetry by Wallace Stevens